Afonso Mendes Ribeiro de Figueiredo (born 6 January 1993) is a Portuguese professional footballer who plays as a left-back for F.C. Penafiel.

Club career

Early years and Braga
Born in Lisbon, Figueiredo played youth football for three clubs, including local Sporting CP from ages 10 to 16. In the summer of 2010 he joined S.C. Braga to complete his development, and made his debut as a senior with the latter's reserves, playing his first game in the Segunda Liga on 19 August 2012 in a 0–0 home draw against Associação Naval 1º de Maio (five minutes played).

Boavista
In the 2013 off-season, Figueiredo dropped down to the third division and signed with Boavista FC. Even though the team finished outside the promotion zone, they were reinstated in the Primeira Liga following the final developments of the Apito Dourado affair.

Figueiredo's maiden appearance in the Portuguese top flight occurred on 4 January 2015, as he featured the entire 3–1 home win over F.C. Arouca. He scored his first league goal on 16 August of that year, in a 2–2 away draw with Vitória de Setúbal.

During his spell at the Estádio do Bessa, Figueiredo appeared in 72 matches in all competitions.

Rennes
On 1 July 2016, free agent Figueiredo moved to Stade Rennais F.C. from the French Ligue 1 on a four year-contract. His official debut only arrived on 1 February of the following year, in a 0–4 home loss against Paris Saint-Germain F.C. in the Coupe de France. His first league came took place two months later, when he played roughly 30 minutes as a substitute in a 1–1 draw with Olympique Lyonnais also at the Roazhon Park.

On 30 January 2018, Figueiredo was loaned to PFC Levski Sofia from Bulgaria until the end of the season.

Return to Portugal
Figueiredo returned to his homeland on 15 June 2018, signing with Rio Ave F.C. for two years. One year later, he agreed to a three-year deal at C.D. Aves also of the top tier.

On 20 October 2020, Figueiredo signed a short-term contract with Moreirense F.C. on a free transfer, after serious injuries to defensive players Pedro Amador and Abdu Conté.

International career
Figueiredo played once for the Portugal Olympic team, featuring 30 minutes in a 4–0 friendly win with Mexico in the Azores on 28 March 2016. He was not, however, selected for Rui Jorge's squad for the Olympic tournament held that year.

References

External links
 

Levski official profile

1993 births
Living people
Portuguese footballers
Footballers from Lisbon
Association football defenders
Primeira Liga players
Liga Portugal 2 players
Campeonato de Portugal (league) players
S.C. Braga B players
Boavista F.C. players
Rio Ave F.C. players
C.D. Aves players
Moreirense F.C. players
C.F. Estrela da Amadora players
F.C. Penafiel players
Ligue 1 players
Stade Rennais F.C. players
First Professional Football League (Bulgaria) players
PFC Levski Sofia players
Portuguese expatriate footballers
Expatriate footballers in France
Expatriate footballers in Bulgaria
Portuguese expatriate sportspeople in France
Portuguese expatriate sportspeople in Bulgaria